Ravi Rathore is a notable Indian polo player and an Arjuna Awardee. He is a Colonel and Commandant of the 61st Cavalry Regiment of the Indian Army, and also holds the appointment of Honorary secretary of the Indian Polo Association (IPA). Ravi Rathore is also the highest handicapped polo player in the Indian Army. He has been an integral part of been part of the Indian Polo team for five consecutive World cup championships and won two golds in 2011 and 2017.

Honours and decorations
President of India Ram Nath Kovind conferred the prestigious Arjuna Award upon Colonel Ravi Rathore for his outstanding achievements in Polo in 2018.

References

Living people
Indian polo players
Indian Army officers
Recipients of the Arjuna Award
Year of birth missing (living people)